King Memorial Chapel  is located on the Cornell College campus in Mount Vernon, Iowa. The chapel was completed in 1882 and is built of Anamosa Limestone quarried in nearby Stone City, Iowa, and has been listed on the National Register of Historic Places since 1976.

History

References

Cornell College
Mount Vernon, Iowa
Churches completed in 1882
Churches on the National Register of Historic Places in Iowa
National Register of Historic Places in Linn County, Iowa
Churches in Linn County, Iowa
Gothic Revival church buildings in Iowa
Clock towers in Iowa